Ascalenia albitergis is a moth in the family Cosmopterigidae. It is found in South Africa.

References

Endemic moths of South Africa
Moths described in 1926
Ascalenia
Moths of Africa